Paul Gordon Hiebert (13 November 1932 – 11 March 2007) was an American missiologist. He was "arguably the world's leading missiological anthropologist."

Biography 
Hiebert was born in India to missionary parents, and studied at Tabor College, Mennonite Brethren Biblical Seminary, and the University of Minnesota.

Subsequently, Hiebert went as a missionary to India and was Principal of the Mennonite Brethren Centenary Bible College, Shamshabad.  After a period of missionary service, he proceeded to Pasadena, California where he taught at Fuller Theological Seminary before becoming Distinguished Professor of Mission and Anthropology at Trinity Evangelical Divinity School. Paul became the Chair of the Department of Missions and Evangelism at Trinity in addition to maintaining his Professor duties. From 1974 to 1975, Hiebert lectured at Osmania University, Hyderabad, India on a Fulbright Scholarship.

A Festschrift in his honor, Globalizing Theology: Belief and Practice in an Era of World Christianity was published in 2006.

Hiebert died of cancer in 2007.

Missiology 
Hiebert developed several theories that widely influenced the study and practice of Christian missions. His model of "critical contextualization" describes a process of understanding and evaluating cultural practices in light of biblical teaching. It is one of the most widely cited models in evangelical doctoral dissertations dealing with contextualization.

The concept of the "excluded middle" argued that most Westerners see the universe as consisting of two tiers - the invisible things of the other world, and the visible things of this world. In this way, they exclude the part in between - namely, the invisible things of this world, and in particular the unseen personal beings, such as angels and demons. Hiebert suggested that non-Westerners are much more likely to accept this "excluded middle".

Hiebert, who studied mathematics as an undergraduate, employed the idea of set theory to describe bounded sets versus centered or fuzzy sets as different ways of conceiving Christian community and theology.

Selected bibliography 
 Cultural Anthropology. Second Edition ed. Grand Rapids, Ml: Baker Book House, 1983.
 Anthropological Insights for Missionaries. Baker Academic. 1985.
 Anthropological Reflections on Missiological Issues. Grand Rapids: Baker Books, 1994.
 Missiological Implications of Epistemological Shifts Harrisburg, Pa: Trinity Press International, 1999.
 Transforming Worldview: An Anthropological Understanding of How People Change. Bakers Academic. 2008. 
 The Gospel in Human Context: Anthropological Exploration for Contemporary Missions. Grand Rapids, MI: Bakers Academic. 2009.

References

External links
Hiebert Global Center for Intercultural Studies

1932 births
2007 deaths
Missiologists
World Christianity scholars

American Protestant missionaries
Tabor College (Kansas) alumni
Fresno Pacific University alumni
University of Minnesota alumni
Academic staff of the Senate of Serampore College (University)
Fuller Theological Seminary faculty
Deaths from cancer in Illinois
Telugu people
People from Telangana
Academic staff of Osmania University
American Mennonites
Mennonite writers